Chinese New Year is the festival that celebrates the beginning of a new year on the traditional lunisolar Chinese calendar. In Chinese, the festival is commonly referred to as the Spring Festival as the spring season in the lunisolar calendar traditionally starts with lichun, the first of the twenty-four solar terms which the festival celebrates around the time of the Chinese New Year. Marking the end of winter and the beginning of the spring season, observances traditionally take place from New Year's Eve, the evening preceding the first day of the year to the Lantern Festival, held on the 15th day of the year. The first day of Chinese New Year begins on the new moon that appears between 21 January and 20 February.

It is also celebrated worldwide in regions and countries that house significant Overseas Chinese or Sinophone populations, especially in Southeast Asia. These include Brunei, Cambodia, Indonesia, Malaysia, Myanmar, the Philippines, Singapore, Thailand, and Vietnam. It is also prominent beyond Asia, especially in Australia, Canada, Mauritius, New Zealand, Peru, South Africa, the United Kingdom, and the United States, as well as various European countries.

The Chinese New Year is associated with several myths and customs. The festival was traditionally a time to honor deities as well as ancestors. Within China, regional customs and traditions concerning the celebration of the New Year vary widely, and the evening preceding the New Year's Day is frequently regarded as an occasion for Chinese families to gather for the annual reunion dinner. It is also a tradition for every family to thoroughly clean their house, in order to sweep away any ill fortune and to make way for incoming good luck. Another custom is the decoration of windows and doors with red paper-cuts and couplets. Popular themes among these paper-cuts and couplets include good fortune or happiness, wealth, and longevity. Other activities include lighting firecrackers and giving money in red envelopes.

Dates in Chinese lunisolar calendar

The Chinese calendar defines the lunar month containing the winter solstice as the eleventh month, meaning that Chinese New Year usually falls on the second new moon after the winter solstice (rarely the third if an intercalary month intervenes). In more than 96 percent of the years, Chinese New Year's Day is the closest date to a new moon to lichun on 4 or 5 February, and the first new moon after dahan. In the Gregorian calendar, the Chinese New Year begins at the new moon that falls between 21 January and 20 February.

Mythology

According to legend, Chinese New Year started with a mythical beast called the Nian (a beast that lives under the sea or in the mountains) during the annual Spring Festival. The Nian would eat villagers, especially children in the middle of the night. One year, all the villagers decided to hide from the beast. An older man appeared before the villagers went into hiding and said that he would stay the night and would get revenge on the Nian. The old man put red papers up and set off firecrackers. The day after, the villagers came back to their town and saw that nothing had been destroyed. They assumed that the old man was a deity who came to save them. The villagers then understood that Yanhuang had discovered that the Nian was afraid of the color red and loud noises.  Then the tradition grew when New Year was approaching, and the villagers would wear red clothes, hang red lanterns, and red spring scrolls on windows and doors and used firecrackers and drums to frighten away the Nian. From then on, Nian never came to the village again. The Nian was eventually captured by Hongjun Laozu, an ancient Taoist monk.

History
Before the new year celebration was established, ancient Chinese gathered and celebrated the end of harvest in autumn. However, this was not the Mid-Autumn Festival, during which Chinese gathered with family to worship the Moon. In the Classic of Poetry, a poem written during Western Zhou (1045 BC – 771 BC) by an anonymous farmer, described the traditions of celebrating the 10th month of the ancient solar calendar, which was in autumn. According to the poem, during this time people clean millet-stack sites, toast guests with mijiu (rice wine), kill lambs and cook their meat, go to their masters' home, toast the master, and cheer the prospect of living long together. The 10th-month celebration is believed to be one of the prototypes of Chinese New Year.
The records of the first Chinese new year celebration can be traced to the Warring States period (475 BC – 221 AD). In the Lüshi Chunqiu, in Qin state an exorcism ritual to expel illness, called "Big Nuo" (大儺), was recorded as being carried out on the last day of the year. Later, Qin unified China, and the Qin dynasty was founded; and the ritual spread. It evolved into the practice of cleaning one's house thoroughly in the days preceding Chinese New Year.

The first mention of celebrating at the start of a new year was recorded during the Han dynasty (202 BC – 220 AD). In the book Simin Yueling (四民月令), written by the Eastern Han agronomist Cui Shi (崔寔), a celebration was described: "The starting day of the first month, is called Zheng Ri. I bring my wife and children, to worship ancestors and commemorate my father." Later he wrote: "Children, wife, grandchildren, and great-grandchildren all serve pepper wine to their parents, make their toast, and wish their parents good health. It's a thriving view." The practice of worshipping ancestors on New Year's Eve is maintained by Chinese people to this day.

Han Chinese also started the custom of visiting acquaintances' homes and wishing each other a happy new year. In Book of the Later Han, volume 27, a county officer was recorded as going to his prefect's house with a government secretary, toasting the prefect, and praising the prefect's merit.

During the Jin dynasty (266 – 420 AD), people started the New Year's Eve tradition of all-night revelry called shousui (守歲). It was described in Western Jin general Zhou Chu's article Fengtu Ji (風土記 “Notes on Local Conditions”): "At the ending of a year, people gift and wish each other, calling it Kuisui (饋歲 “gift time”); people invited others with drinks and food, calling it Biesui (別歲 “others time”); on New Year's Eve, people stayed up all night until sunrise, calling it Shousui (守歲 “guard the year”)." The article used the word chu xi (除夕) to indicate New Year's Eve, and the name is still used until this day.

The Northern and Southern dynasties book Jingchu Suishiji described the practice of firing bamboo in the early morning of New Year's Day, which became a New Year tradition of the ancient Chinese. Poet and chancellor of the Tang dynasty Lai Gu also described this tradition in his poem Early Spring (早春): "新曆才将半纸开，小亭猶聚爆竿灰", meaning "Another new year just started as a half opening paper, and the family gathered around the dust of exploded bamboo pole". The practice was used by ancient Chinese people to scare away evil spirits, since firing bamboo would noisily crack or explode the hard plant.

During the Tang dynasty, people established the custom of sending bai nian tie (拜年帖), which are New Year's greeting cards. It is said that the custom was started by Emperor Taizong of Tang. The emperor wrote "普天同慶" (whole nation celebrate together) on gold leaves and sent them to his ministers. Word of the emperor's gesture spread, and later it became the custom of people in general, who used Xuan paper instead of gold leaves. Another theory is that bai nian tie was derived from the Han dynasty's name tag, "門狀" (door opening). As imperial examinations became essential and reached their heyday under the Tang dynasty, candidates curried favour to become pupils of respected teachers, in order to get recommendation letters. After obtaining good examination marks, a pupil went to the teacher's home with a men zhuang (门状) to convey their gratitude. Therefore, eventually men zhuang became a symbol of good luck, and people started sending them to friends on New Year's Day, calling them by a new name, bai nian tie (拜年帖, New Year's Greetings).

The Chunlian (Spring Couplets) was written by Meng Chang, an emperor of the Later Shu (935–965 AD), during the Five Dynasties and Ten Kingdoms period："新年納餘慶，嘉節號長春" (Enjoying past legacies in the new year, the holiday foreseeing the long-lasting spring). As described by Song dynasty official Zhang Tangying in his book Shu Tao Wu, volume 2: on the day of New Year's Eve, the emperor ordered the scholar Xin Yinxun to write the couplets on peach wood and hang them on the emperor's bedroom door. It is believed that placing the couplets on the door to the home in the days preceding the new year was widespread during the Song dynasty. The famous Northern Song politician, litterateur, philosopher, and poet Wang Anshi recorded the custom in his poem "元日" (New Year's Day).

The poem Yuan Ri (元日) also includes the word "爆竹" (bao zhu, exploding bamboo), which is believed to be a reference to firecrackers, instead of the previous tradition of firing bamboo, both of which are called the same in the Chinese language. After gunpowder was invented in the Tang dynasty and widely used under the Song dynasty, people modified the tradition of firing bamboo by filling the bamboo pole with gunpowder, which made for louder explosions. Later under the Song, people discarded the bamboo and started to use paper to wrap the gunpowder in cylinders, in imitation of the bamboo. The firecracker was still called "爆竹", thus equating the new and old traditions. It is also recorded that people linked the firecrackers with hemp rope and created the "鞭炮" (bian pao, gunpowder whip) in the Song dynasty. Both "爆竹" and "鞭炮" are still used by present-day people to celebrate the Chinese New Year and other festive occasions.

It was also during the Song dynasty that people started to give money to children in celebration of a new year. The money was called sui nian qian (随年钱), meaning "the money based on age". In the chapter "Ending of a year" (歲除) of Wulin jiushi (武林舊事), the writer recorded that concubines of the emperor prepared a hundred and twenty coins for princes and princesses, to wish them long lives.

The new year celebration continued under the Yuan dynasty, when people also gave nian gao (年糕, year cakes) to relatives.

The tradition of eating Chinese dumplings jiaozi (餃子) was established under the Ming dynasty at the latest. It is described in the book Youzhongzhi (酌中志): "People get up at 5 in the morning of new year's day, burn incense and light firecrackers, throw door latch or wooden bars in the air three times, drink pepper and thuja wine, eat dumplings. Sometimes put one or two silver currency inside dumplings, and whoever gets the money will attain a year of fortune." Modern Chinese people also put other food that is auspicious into dumplings: such as dates, which prophesy a flourishing new year; candy, which predicts sweet days; and nian gao, which foretells a rich life.

In the Qing dynasty, the name ya sui qian (壓歲錢, New Year's Money) was given to the lucky money given to children at the new year. The book Qing Jia Lu (清嘉錄) recorded: "elders give children coins threaded together by a red string, and the money is called Ya Sui Qian." The name is still used by modern Chinese people. The lucky money was presented in one of two forms: one was coins strung on red string; the other was a colorful purse filled with coins.
In 1928, the ruling Kuomintang party decreed that the Chinese New Year would fall on 1 Jan of the Gregorian Calendar, but this was abandoned due to overwhelming popular opposition. In 1967, during the Cultural Revolution, official Chinese New Year celebrations were banned in China. The State Council of the People's Republic of China announced that the public should "change customs"; have a "revolutionized and fighting Spring Festival"; and since people needed to work on Chinese New Year Eve, they did not need holidays during Spring Festival day. The old celebrations were reinstated in 1980.

Naming
While "Chinese New Year" remains the official name for the festival in Taiwan, the name "Spring Festival" was adopted by the People's Republic of China instead. On the other hand, some in the Chinese diaspora use the term "Lunar New Year", while "Chinese New Year" remains a popular and convenient translation for people of non-Chinese cultural backgrounds. Along with the Han Chinese in and outside Greater China, as many as 29 of the 55 ethnic minority groups in China also celebrate Chinese New Year. Korea, Vietnam, Singapore, Malaysia, Indonesia and the Philippines celebrate it as an official festival.

Public holiday
Chinese New Year is observed as a public holiday in some countries and territories where there is a sizable Chinese population. Since Chinese New Year falls on different dates on the Gregorian calendar every year on different days of the week, some of these governments opt to shift working days in order to accommodate a longer public holiday. In some countries, a statutory holiday is added on the following work day if the New Year (as a public holiday) falls on a weekend, as in the case of 2013, where the New Year's Eve (9 February) falls on Saturday and the New Year's Day (10 February) on Sunday. Depending on the country, the holiday may be termed differently; common names in English are "Chinese New Year", "Lunar New Year", "New Year Festival", and "Spring Festival".

For New Year celebrations that are lunar but are outside of China and Chinese diaspora (such as Korea's Seollal and Vietnam's Tết), see the article on Lunar New Year.

For other countries and regions where Chinese New Year is celebrated but not an official holiday, see the table below.

Festivities

During the festival, people around China will prepare different gourmet dishes for their families and guests. Influenced by the flourished cultures, foods from different places look and taste totally different. Among them, the most well-known ones are dumplings from northern China and Tangyuan from southern China.

Preceding days
On the eighth day of the lunar month prior to Chinese New Year, the Laba holiday, a traditional porridge, Laba porridge, is served in remembrance of an ancient festival, called La, that occurred shortly after the winter solstice. Pickles such as Laba garlic, which turns green from vinegar, are also made on this day. For those that practice Buddhism, the Laba holiday is also considered Bodhi Day. Layue is a term often associated with Chinese New Year as it refers to the sacrifices held in honor of the gods in the twelfth lunar month, hence the cured meats of Chinese New Year are known as larou. The porridge was prepared by the women of the household at first light, with the first bowl offered to the family's ancestors and the household deities. Every member of the family was then served a bowl, with leftovers distributed to relatives and friends. It's still served as a special breakfast on this day in some Chinese homes. The concept of the "La month" is similar to Advent in Christianity. Many families eat vegetarian on Chinese New Year eve, the garlic and preserved meat are eaten on Chinese New Year day.

On the days immediately before the New Year celebration, Chinese families give their homes a thorough cleaning. There is a Cantonese saying "Wash away the dirt on nin ya baat", but the practice is not restricted to nin ya baat (the 28th day of month 12). It is believed the cleaning sweeps away the bad luck of the preceding year and makes their homes ready for good luck. Brooms and dust pans are put away on the first day so that the newly arrived good luck cannot be swept away. Some people give their homes, doors and window-frames a new coat of red paint; decorators and paper-hangers do a year-end rush of business prior to Chinese New Year. Homes are often decorated with paper cutouts of Chinese auspicious phrases and couplets. Purchasing new clothing and shoes also symbolize a new start. Any hair cuts need to be completed before the New Year, as cutting hair on New Year is considered bad luck due to the  homonymic nature of the word "hair" (fa) and the word for "prosperity". Businesses are expected to pay off all the debts outstanding for the year before the new year eve, extending to debts of gratitude. Thus it is a common practice to send gifts and rice to close business associates, and extended family members.

In many households where Buddhism or Taoism is observed, home altars and statues are cleaned thoroughly, and decorations used to adorn altars over the past year are taken down and burned a week before the new year starts on Little New Year, to be replaced with new decorations. Taoists (and Buddhists to a lesser extent) will also "send gods back to heaven", an example would be burning a paper effigy of Zao Jun the Kitchen God, the recorder of family functions. This is done so that the Kitchen God can report to the Jade Emperor of the family household's transgressions and good deeds. Families often offer sweet foods (such as candy) in order to "bribe" the deities into reporting good things about the family.

Prior to the Reunion Dinner, a prayer of thanksgiving is held to mark the safe passage of the previous year. Confucianists take the opportunity to remember their ancestors, and those who had lived before them are revered. Some people do not give a Buddhist prayer due to the influence of Christianity, with a Christian prayer offered instead.

Chinese New Year's Eve

The day before the Chinese New Year usually accompanied with a dinner feast, consisting of special meats are served at the tables, as a main course for the dinner and as an offering for the New Year. This meal is comparable to Thanksgiving dinner in the U.S. and remotely similar to Christmas dinner in other countries with a high percentage of Christians.

In northern China, it is customary to make jiaozi, or dumplings, after dinner to eat around midnight. Dumplings symbolize wealth because their shape resembles a Chinese sycee. In contrast, in the South, it is customary to make a glutinous new year cake (niangao) and send pieces of it as gifts to relatives and friends in the coming days. Niángāo [Pinyin] literally means "new year cake" with a homophonous meaning of "increasingly prosperous year in year out".

After dinner, some families may visit local temples hours before midnight to pray for success by lighting the first incense of the year; however in modern practice, many households held parties to celebrate. Traditionally, firecrackers were lit to ward evil spirits when the household doors sealed, and are not to be reopened until dawn in a ritual called "opening the door of fortune". A tradition of staying up late on Chinese New Year's Eve is known as shousui, which is still practised as it is thought to add on to one's parents' longevity.

First day
The first day, known as the "Spring Festival" is for the welcoming of the deities of the heavens and Earth on midnight. It is a traditional practice to light fireworks, burn bamboo sticks and firecrackers, and lion dance troupes, were done commonly as a tradition to ward off evil spirits.

Typical actions such as lighting fires and using knives are considered taboo, thus all consumable food has to be cooked prior. Using the broom, swearing, and breaking any dinnerware without appeasing the deities are also considered taboo.

Normal traditions occurring on the first day involve house gatherings to the families, specifically the elders and families to the oldest and most senior members of their extended families, usually their parents, grandparents and great-grandparents, and trading Mandarin oranges as a courtesy to symbolize wealth and good luck. Members of the family who are married also give red envelopes containing cash known as lai see or angpow (Hokkien and Teochew), or hongbao, a form of a blessing and to suppress both the aging and challenges that were associated with the coming year, to junior members of the family, mostly children and teenagers. Business managers may also give bonuses in the form of red packets to employees. The money can be of any form, specifically numbers ending with 8, which sounded as huat, meaning prosperity, but packets with denominations of odd numbers or without money are usually not allowed due to bad luck, especially the number 4 which sounded as si, which means death.

While fireworks and firecrackers are traditionally very popular, some regions have banned them due to concerns over fire hazards. For this reason, various city governments (e.g., Kowloon, Beijing, Shanghai for a number of years) issued bans over fireworks and firecrackers in certain precincts of the city. As a substitute, large-scale fireworks display have been launched by governments in Hong Kong and Singapore.

Second day

The second day, entitled "a year's beginning", oversees married daughters visiting their birth parents, relatives and close friends, often renew family ties and relationship. (Traditionally, married daughters didn't have the opportunity to visit their birth families frequently.)

The second day also saw giving offering money and sacrifices to God of Wealth to symbolize a rewarding time after hardship in the preceding year. During the days of imperial China, "beggars and other unemployed people circulate[d] from family to family, carrying a picture [of the God of Wealth] shouting, "Cai Shen dao!" [The God of Wealth has come!]." Householders would respond with "lucky money" to reward the messengers. Business people of the Cantonese dialect group will hold a 'Hoi Nin' prayer to start their business on the second day of Chinese New Year, blessing business to strive in the coming year.

As this day is believed to be The Birthday of Che Kung, a deity worshipped in Hong Kong, worshippers go to Che Kung Temples to pray for his blessing. A representative from the government asks Che Kung about the city's fortune through kau cim.

Third day
The third day is known as "red mouth". Chikou is also called "Chigou's Day". Chigou, literally "red dog", is an epithet of "the God of Blazing Wrath". Rural villagers continue the tradition of burning paper offerings over trash fires. It is considered an unlucky day to have guests or go visiting. Hakka villagers in rural Hong Kong in the 1960s called it the Day of the Poor Devil and believed everyone should stay at home. This is also considered a propitious day to visit the temple of the God of Wealth and have one's future told.

Fourth day
In those communities that celebrate Chinese New Year for 15 days, the fourth day is when corporate "spring dinners" kick off and business returns to normal. Other areas that have a longer Chinese New Year holiday will celebrate and welcome the gods that were previously sent on this day.

Fifth day
This day is the god of Wealth's birthday. In northern China, people eat jiaozi, or dumplings, on the morning of powu. In Taiwan, businesses traditionally re-open on the next day (the sixth day), accompanied by firecrackers.

It is also common in China that on the 5th day people will shoot off firecrackers to get Guan Yu's attention, thus ensuring his favor and good fortune for the new year.

Sixth day
The sixth day is Horse's Day, on which people drive away the Ghost of Poverty by throwing out the garbage stored up during the festival. The ways vary but basically have the same meaning—to drive away the Ghost of Poverty, which reflects the general desire of the Chinese people to ring out the old and ring in the new, to send away the previous poverty and hardship and to usher in the good life of the New Year.

Seventh day

The seventh day, traditionally known as Renri (the common person's birthday), is the day when everyone grows one year older. In some overseas Chinese communities in Southeast Asia, such as Malaysia and Singapore, it is also the day when tossed raw fish salad, yusheng, is eaten for continued wealth and prosperity.

For many Chinese Buddhists, this is another day to avoid meat, the seventh day commemorating the birth of Sakra, lord of the devas in Buddhist cosmology who is analogous to the Jade Emperor.

Eighth day
Another family dinner is held to celebrate the eve of the birth of the Jade Emperor, the ruler of heaven. People normally return to work by the eighth day, therefore the Store owners will host a lunch/dinner with their employees, thanking their employees for the work they have done for the whole year.

Ninth day
The ninth day is traditionally known as the birthday of the Jade Emperor of Heaven and many people offered prayer in the Taoist Pantheon as thanks or gratitude., and it is commonly known as called Ti Kong Dan, Ti Kong Si or Pai Ti Kong, which is especially important to Hokkiens other than the first day of the Chinese New Year.

A prominent requisite offering is sugarcane. Legends holds that the Hokkien were spared from a massacre by Japanese pirates by hiding in a sugarcane plantation between the eighth and ninth days of the Chinese New Year, coinciding with the Jade Emperor's birthday. "Sugarcane" is a near homonym to "thank you" in the Hokkien dialect.

In the morning (traditionally anytime between midnight and 7 am), Taiwanese households set up an altar table with three layers: one top (containing offertories of six vegetables (those being noodles, fruits, cakes, tangyuan, vegetable bowls, and unripe betel), all decorated with paper lanterns) and two lower levels (five sacrifices and wines) to honor the deities below the Jade Emperor. The household then kneels three times and kowtows nine times to pay obeisance and wish him a long life.

Incense, tea, fruit, vegetarian food or roast pig, and gold paper, are served as a customary protocol for paying respect to an honored person.

Tenth day
The nation celebrates the Jade Emperor's birthday on this day.

Fifteenth day

The fifteenth day of the new year is celebrated as the Lantern Festival, also known as the Yuanxiao Festival, the Shangyuan Festival, and Chap Goh Meh ( in Hokkien). Rice dumplings, or tangyuan, a sweet glutinous rice ball brewed in a soup, are eaten this day. Candles are lit outside houses as a way to guide wayward spirits home. Families may walk the streets carrying lanterns, which sometimes have riddles attached to or written on them as a tradition.

In China and Malaysia, this day is celebrated by individuals seeking a romantic partner, akin to Valentine's Day. Nowadays, single women write their contact number on mandarin oranges and throw them in a river or a lake after which single men collect the oranges and eat them. The taste is an indication of their possible love: sweet represents a good fate while sour represents a bad fate.

This day often marks the end of the Chinese New Year festivities.

Traditional food

A reunion dinner (nián yè fàn) is held on New Year's Eve during which family members gather for a celebration. The venue will usually be in or near the home of the most senior member of the family. The New Year's Eve dinner is very large and sumptuous and traditionally includes dishes of meat (namely, pork and chicken) and fish. Most reunion dinners also feature a communal hot pot as it is believed to signify the coming together of the family members for the meal. Most reunion dinners (particularly in the Southern regions) also prominently feature specialty meats (e.g. wax-cured meats like duck and Chinese sausage) and seafood (e.g. lobster and abalone) that are usually reserved for this and other special occasions during the remainder of the year. In most areas, fish is included, but not eaten completely (and the remainder is stored overnight), as the Chinese phrase "may there be surpluses every year" sounds the same as "let there be fish every year." Eight individual dishes are served to reflect the belief of good fortune associated with the number. If in the previous year a death was experienced in the family, seven dishes are served.

Other traditional foods consists of noodles, fruits, dumplings, spring rolls, and Tangyuan which are also known as sweet rice balls. Each dish served during Chinese New Year represents something special. The noodles used to make longevity noodles are usually very thin, long wheat noodles. These noodles are longer than normal noodles that are usually fried and served on a plate, or boiled and served in a bowl with its broth. The noodles symbolize the wish for a long life. The fruits that are typically selected would be oranges, tangerines, and pomelos as they are round and "golden" color symbolizing fullness and wealth. Their lucky sound when spoken also brings good luck and fortune. The Chinese pronunciation for orange is 橙 (chéng), which sounds the same as the Chinese for 'success' (成). One of the ways to spell tangerine(桔 jú) contains the Chinese character for luck (吉 jí). Pomelos are believed to bring constant prosperity. Pomelo in Chinese (柚 yòu) sounds similar to 'to have' (有 yǒu), disregarding its tone, however it sounds exactly like 'again' (又 yòu).  Dumplings and spring rolls symbolize wealth, whereas sweet rice balls symbolize family togetherness.

Red packets for the immediate family are sometimes distributed during the reunion dinner. These packets contain money in an amount that reflects good luck and honorability. Several foods are consumed to usher in wealth, happiness, and good fortune. Several of the Chinese food names are homophones for words that also mean good things.

Many families in China still follow the tradition of eating only vegetarian food on the first day of the New Year, as it is believed that doing so will bring good luck into their lives for the whole year.

Like many other New Year dishes, certain ingredients also take special precedence over others as these ingredients also have similar-sounding names with prosperity, good luck, or even counting money.

Practices

Red envelopes

Traditionally, red envelopes or red packets 
(Hakka: fung bao / Cantonese) are passed out during the Chinese New Year's celebrations, from married couples or the elderly to unmarried juniors or children. According to legend, a demon named Sui patted a child on the head three times on New Year's Eve, and the child would have a fever. The parents wrapped coins in red paper and placed them next to their children's pillows. When Sui came, the flash of the coin scared him away. From then on, every New Year's Eve, parents will wrap the coin in red paper to protect their children.

Red packets almost always contain money, usually varying from a couple of dollars to several hundred. Chinese superstitions favour amounts that begin with even numbers, such as 8 (八), a homophone for "wealth", and 6 (六), a homophone for "smooth"—but not the number 4 (四), which is a homophone of "death", and is, as such, considered unlucky in Asian culture. Odd numbers are also avoided, as they are associated with cash given during funerals (帛金). It is also customary for bills placed inside a red envelope to be new.

The act of asking for red packets is normally called (Mandarin): 討紅包 tǎo-hóngbāo, 要利是 or (Cantonese): 逗利是. A married person would not turn down such a request as it would mean that he or she would be "out of luck" in the new year. Red packets are generally given by married couples to the younger non-married members of the family. It is custom and polite for children to wish elders a happy new year and a year of happiness, health and good fortune before accepting the red envelope. Red envelopes are then kept under the pillow and slept on for seven nights after Chinese New Year before opening because that symbolizes good luck and fortune.

In Taiwan in the 2000s, some employers also gave red packets as a bonus to maids, nurses or domestic workers from Southeast Asian countries, although whether this is appropriate is controversial.

In the mid-2010s, Chinese messaging apps such as WeChat popularized the distribution of red envelopes in a virtual format via mobile payments, usually within group chats. In 2017, it was estimated that over 100 billion of these virtual red envelopes would be sent over the New Year holiday.

Mythology
In ancient times, there is a monster named sui (祟) which comes out on New Year's Eve and touches the heads of sleeping children. The child will be frightened by the touch and wake up and have a fever. The fever eventually will cause the child to have intellectual disabilities. Hence, families will light up their homes and stay awake, leading to a tradition of 守祟, to guide against sui from harming their children.

A folklore tale of sui is about an elderly couple with a precious son. On the night of New Year's Eve, since they were afraid that sui would come, they took out eight pieces of copper coins to play with their son in order to keep him awake. Their son was very sleepy, however, so they let him go to sleep after placing a red paper bag containing the copper coins under the child's pillow. The two older children also stayed with him for the whole night. Suddenly, the doors and windows were blown open by a strange wind, and even the candlelight was extinguished. It turned out to be a sui. When the sui was going to reach out and touch the child's head, the pillow suddenly brightened with the golden light, and the sui was scared away, so the exorcism effect of "red paper wrapped copper money" spread in the past China (see also Chinese numismatic charms). The money is then called "ya sui qian (壓歲錢)", the money to suppress sui.

Another tale is that a huge demon was terrorising a village and there was nobody in the village who was able to defeat the demon; many warriors and statesmen had tried with no luck. A young orphan stepped in, armed with a magical sword that was inherited from his ancestors, and battled the demon, eventually killing it. Peace was finally restored to the village, and the elders all presented the brave young man with a red envelope filled with money to repay the young orphan for his courage and for ridding the village of the demon.

Gift exchange

In addition to red envelopes, which are usually given from older people to younger people, small gifts (usually food or sweets) are also exchanged between friends or relatives (of different households) during Chinese New Year. Gifts are usually brought when visiting friends or relatives at their homes. Common gifts include fruits (typically oranges, but never trade pears), cakes, biscuits, chocolates, and candies. Gifts are preferred to be wrapped with red or golden paper, which symbolises good luck.

Certain items should not be given, as they are considered taboo. Taboo gifts include:
 items associated with funerals (i.e. handkerchiefs, towels, chrysanthemums, items colored white and black)
 items that show that time is running out (i.e. clocks and watches)
 sharp objects that symbolize cutting a tie (i.e. scissors and knives)
 items that symbolize that you want to walk away from a relationship (examples: shoes and sandals)
 mirrors
 homonyms for unpleasant topics (examples: "clock" sounds like "the funeral ritual" or "the end of life", green hats because "wear a green hat" sounds like "cuckold", "handkerchief" sounds like "goodbye", "pear" sounds like "separate", "umbrella" sounds like "disperse", and "shoe" sounds like a "rough" year).

Markets
Markets or village fairs are set up as the New Year is approaching. These usually open-air markets feature new year related products such as flowers, toys, clothing, and even fireworks and firecrackers. It is convenient for people to buy gifts for their new year visits as well as their home decorations. In some places, the practice of shopping for the perfect plum tree is not dissimilar to the Western tradition of buying a Christmas tree.

Fireworks

Bamboo stems filled with gunpowder that was burnt to create small explosions were once used in ancient China to drive away evil spirits. In modern times, this method has eventually evolved into the use of firecrackers during the festive season. Firecrackers are usually strung on a long fused string so it can be hung down. Each firecracker is rolled up in red papers, as red is auspicious, with gunpowder in its core. Once ignited, the firecracker lets out a loud popping noise and, as they are usually strung together by the hundreds, the firecrackers are known for their deafening explosions that are thought to scare away evil spirits. The burning of firecrackers also signifies a joyful time of year and has become an integral aspect of Chinese New Year celebrations. Since the 2000s, firecrackers have been banned in various countries and towns.

Music
"Happy New Year!" is a popular children's song for the New Year holiday. The melody is similar to the American folk song, Oh My Darling, Clementine. Another popular Chinese New Year song is Gong Xi Gong Xi()
.

Movies 

Watching Chinese New Year films is an expression of Chinese cultural identity. During the New Year holidays, the stage boss gathers the most popular actors whom from various troupes let them perform repertories from Qing dynasty. Nowadays many people celebrate the new year by watching these movies.

Hong Kong filmmakers also release Chinese New Year films, mostly comedies, at this time of year.

Clothing

The color red is commonly worn throughout Chinese New Year; traditional beliefs held that red could scare away evil spirits. The wearing of new clothes is another clothing custom during the festival; the new clothes symbolize a new beginning in the year.

Family portrait
In some places, the taking of a family portrait is an important ceremony after the relatives are gathered. The photo is taken at the hall of the house or taken in front of the house. The most senior male head of the family sits in the center.

Symbolism

As with all cultures, Chinese New Year traditions incorporate elements that are symbolic of deeper meaning. One common example of Chinese New Year symbolism is the red diamond-shaped fu characters, which are displayed on the entrances of Chinese homes. Therefore, it symbolizes the arrival of luck, happiness, and prosperity.

For the Cantonese-speaking people, if the fu sign is hung upside down, the implied dao (upside down) sounds like the Cantonese word for "pour", producing "pour the luck [away]", which would usually symbolize bad luck; this is why the fu character is not usually hung upside-down in Cantonese communities.

Red is the predominant color used in New Year celebrations. Red is the emblem of joy, and this color also symbolizes virtue, truth and sincerity. On the Chinese opera stage, a painted red face usually denotes a sacred or loyal personage and sometimes a great emperor. Candies, cakes, decorations and many things associated with the New Year and its ceremonies are colored red. The sound of the Chinese word for "red" is in Mandarin homophonous with the word for "prosperous." Therefore, red is an auspicious color and has an auspicious sound.
According to Chinese tradition, the year of the pig is a generally unlucky year for the public, which is why you need to reevaluate most of your decisions before you reach a conclusion. However, this only helps you get even more control over your life as you learn to stay ahead of everything by being cautious.

Nianhua

Nianhua can be a form of Chinese colored woodblock printing, for decoration during Chinese New Year. Nianhua uses a range of subjects to express and invite positive prospects as the new year begins. The most popular representatives of these prospects take inspiration from nature, religion, folklore, etc., and are portrayed in flashy and lively ways.

Flowers
The following are popular floral decorations for the New Year and are available at new year markets.
{| class="wikitable"
!Floral Decor ||Meaning
|-
|Plum Blossom || symbolizes luckiness
|-
|Kumquat || symbolizes prosperity
|-
|Calamondin
|Symbolizes luck
|-
|Narcissus || symbolizes prosperity
|-
|Bamboo || a plant used for any time of year, its sturdiness represents strength
|-
|Sunflower || means to have a good year
|-
|Eggplant ||a plant to heal all of your sicknesses
|-
|Chom Mon Plant || a plant which gives you tranquility
|-
|Orchid
|represents fertility and abundance, as well as good taste, beauty, luxury and innocence
|}

Each flower has a symbolic meaning, and many Chinese people believe that it may usher in the values that it represents. In general, except those in lucky colour like red and yellow, chrysanthemum should not be put at home during the new year, because it is normally used for ancestral veneration.

Icons and ornaments
{| class="wikitable"
! style="width:150px;"|Icons || Meaning || Illustrations
|-
| Lanterns || These lanterns that differ from those of Mid-Autumn Festival in general. They will be red in color and tend to be oval in shape. These are the traditional Chinese paper lanterns. Those lanterns, used on the fifteenth day of the Chinese New Year for the Lantern Festival, are bright, colorful, and in many different sizes and shapes.
| 
|-
| Decoration || Decorations generally convey a New Year greeting. They are not advertisements. Faichun, also known as Huichun—Chinese calligraphy of auspicious Chinese idioms on typically red posters—are hung on doorways and walls. Other decorations include a New year picture, Chinese knots, and papercutting and couplets. ||  
|-
| Dragon dance and Lion dance || Dragon and lion dances are common during Chinese New Year. It is believed that the loud beats of the drum and the deafening sounds of the cymbals together with the face of the Dragon or lion dancing aggressively can evict bad or evil spirits. Lion dances are also popular for opening of businesses in Hong Kong and Macau. ||  
|-
| Fu Lu Shou || Nianhua of the Fu Lu Shou || 
|-
| Red envelope || Typically given to children, elderly and Dragon/Lion Dance performers while saying  t  ,   || 
|}

Spring travel

Traditionally, families gather together during the Chinese New Year. In modern China, migrant workers in China travel home to have reunion dinners with their families on Chinese New Year's Eve. Owing to a large number of interprovincial travelers, special arrangements were made by railways, buses and airlines starting from 15 days before the New Year's Day. This 40-day period is called chunyun, and is known as the world's largest annual migration. More interurban trips are taken in China in this period than the total population of China.

In Taiwan, spring travel is also a major event. The majority of transportation in western Taiwan is in a north–south direction: long-distance travel between urbanized north and hometowns in the rural south. Transportation in eastern Taiwan and that between Taiwan and its islands is less convenient. Cross-strait flights between Taiwan and China began in 2003 as part of Three Links, mostly for "Taiwanese businessmen" to return to Taiwan for the new year.

Festivities outside China

Chinese New Year is also celebrated annually in many countries which houses significant Chinese populations. These include countries throughout Asia, Oceania, and North America. Sydney, London, and San Francisco claim to host the largest New Year celebration outside of Asia and South America.

Southeast Asia
Chinese New Year is a national public holiday in many Southeast Asian countries and considered to be one of the most important holidays of the year.

Malaysia

Chinese New Year's Eve is typically a half-day holiday in Malaysia, while Chinese New Year is a two-day public holiday. The biggest celebrations take place in Malaysia (notably in Kuala Lumpur, George Town, Johor Bahru and Ipoh.

Singapore
In Singapore, Chinese New Year is officially a two-day public holiday. Chinese New Year is accompanied by various festive activities. One of the main highlights is the Chinatown celebrations. In 2010, this included a Festive Street Bazaar, nightly staged shows at Kreta Ayer Square and a lion dance competition. The Chingay Parade also features prominently in the celebrations. It is an annual street parade in Singapore, well known for its colorful floats and wide variety of cultural performances. The highlights of the Parade for 2011 include a Fire Party, multi-ethnic performances and an unprecedented travelling dance competition.

Philippines
In the Philippines, Chinese New Year (Philippine Hokkien ) is considered as one of the important festivals for Chinese Filipinos, and its celebration has also extended to the majority non-Chinese Filipinos, especially since in 2012, Chinese New Year was included as a public regular non-working holiday in the Philippines. During this time of year, the selling or giving of Tikoy, especially by Chinese Filipinos, is widely known and practiced in the country. Celebrations are centered primarily in Binondo in Manila, the oldest ever Chinatown in the world, with other celebrations in key cities.

Indonesia

In Indonesia, the Chinese New Year is officially named Tahun Baru Imlek, or Sin Cia in Hokkien. It was celebrated as one of the official national religious holiday by Chinese Indonesians since 18 June 1946 to 1 January 1953 through government regulation signed by President Sukarno on 18 June 1946. It was unofficially celebrated by ethnic Chinese from 1953 to 1967 based on government regulation signed by Vice President Muhammad Hatta on 5 February 1953 which annul the previous regulation, among others, the Chinese New Year as a national religious holiday.

Effectively from 6 December 1967, until 1998, the spiritual practice to celebrate the Chinese New Year by Chinese families was restricted specifically only inside of the Chinese house. This restriction is made by the New Order government through a Presidential Instruction No. 14 of 1967 signed by President Suharto. This restriction is ended when the regime has changed and the President Suharto was overthrown. The celebration was conducted unofficially by Chinese community from 1999 to 2000.

On 17 January 2000, the President Abdurrahman Wahid issued Presidential Decree No. 6 of 2000 to annul the previous instruction. On 19 January 2001, the Ministry of Religious Affairs issued Minsterial Decree  No.13 of 2001 on Imlek Day as a National Holiday to set Hari Tahun Baru Imlek as a "facultative holiday" for Chinese community. Through the Presidential Decree it was officially declared as a 1 (one) day public religious holiday as of 9 April 2002 by President Megawati. The Indonesian government authorize only the first day of the Chinese New Year as a public religious holiday and it is specifically designated only for Chinese people.

In Indonesia, the first day of the Chinese New Year is recognized as a part of the celebration of the Chinese religion and tradition of Chinese community. There are no other official or unofficial of the Chinese New Year as a public holiday. The remaining 14 days are celebrated only by ethnic Chinese families. In Indonesia, the Chinese Year is named as a year of Kǒngzǐ or Kongzili in Indonesian. Every year, the Ministry of Religious Affairs set the specific date of religious holiday based on input from religious leaders. The Chinese New Year is the only national religious holiday in Indonesia that was enacted specifically with the Presidential Decree, in this case with the Presidential Decree No. 19 of 2002 dated on 9 April 2002. The celebration of the Chinese New Year as a religious holiday is specifically intended only for Chinese people in Indonesia (tradisi masyarakat Cina yang dirayakan secara turun temurun di berbagai wilayah di Indonesia, dan umat Agama Tionghoa) and it is not intended to be celebrated by native Indonesians.

Cities with significant Chinese populations in Indonesia include Jakarta, Medan, Batam, Surabaya, Semarang, Surakarta, Singkawang, Pangkal Pinang, Binjai, Bagansiapiapi, Tanjungbalai, Pematangsiantar, Selat Panjang, Pekanbaru, Tanjung Pinang, Ketapang, Pontianak, Sungailiat, Tanjung Pandan, Manggar, Toboali, Muntok, Lubuk Pakam, Bandung, Rantau Prapat, Tebing Tinggi, Sibolga, Dumai, Panipahan, Bagan Batu, Tanjung Balai Karimun, Palembang, Bengkayang, Manado, and Tangerang always have its own New Year's celebration every years with parade and fireworks. A lot shopping malls decorated its building with lantern, Chinese words and lion or dragon with red and gold as main color. Lion dance is a common sight around Chinese houses, temples and its shophouses. Usually, the Buddhist, Confucian and Taoist Chinese will burn a big incense made by aloeswood with dragon-decorated at front of their house. The Chinese temple is open 24 hours at the first day, their also distributes a red envelopes and sometimes rice, fruits or sugar to the poor around.

Thailand
In Thailand, one of the most populous Chinese descent populated countries. Also celebrated the great Chinese New Year festivities throughout the country, especially in provinces where many people of Chinese descent live such as Nakhon Sawan, Suphan Buri, Phuket etc. Which is considered to promote tourism in the same agenda as well.

Divided into 3 days, the first day is the Wan chai (pay day), meaning the day that people go out to shop for offerings, the second day is the Wan wai (worship day), is a day of worshiping the gods and ancestral spirits, which is divided into three periods: dawn, late morning and afternoon, the third day is a Wan tieow (holiday), is a holiday that everyone will leave the house to travel or to bless relatives or respectable people. And often wear red clothes because it is believed to bring auspiciousness to life.

Observed by Thai Chinese and parts of the private sector. Usually celebrated for three days, starting on the day before Chinese New Year's Eve. Chinese New Year is observed as a public holiday in Narathiwat, Pattani, Yala, Satun and Songkhla Provinces. For the year 2021 (one year only) the government declared Chinese New Year a government holiday. It applies mostly to civil servants, financial institutions and private businesses can decide whether or not to observe it.

In the capital, Bangkok in Chinatown, Yaowarat Road, there is a great celebration. Which usually closes the road making it a pedestrian street and often have a member of royal family came to be the president of the ceremony, always open every year, such as Princess Maha Chakri Sirindhorn.

Australia and New Zealand

With one of the largest Chinese populations outside of Asia, Sydney also claims to have the largest Chinese New Year Celebrations outside of Asia with over 600,000 people attending the celebrations in Chinatown annually. The events there span over three weeks including the launch celebration, outdoor markets, evening street food stalls, Chinese top opera performances, dragon boat races, a film festival and multiple parades that incorporate Chinese, Japanese, Korean and Vietnamese people. More than 100,000 people attend notably the main parade with over 3,500 performers. The festival also attracts international media coverage, reaching millions of viewers in Asia. The festival in Sydney is organized in partnership with a different Chinese province each year. Apart from Sydney, other state capital cities in Australia also celebrate Chinese New Year due to large number of Chinese residents. The cities include: Brisbane, Adelaide, Melbourne Box Hill and Perth. The common activities are lion dance, dragon dance, New Year market, and food festival. In the Melbourne suburb of Footscray, Victoria a Lunar New Year celebration initially focusing on the Vietnamese New Year has expanded into a celebration of the Chinese New Year as well as the April New Year celebrations of the Thais, Cambodians, Laotians and other Asian Australian communities who celebrate the New Year in either January/February or April.

The city of Wellington hosts a two-day weekend festival for Chinese New Year, and a one-day festival is held in Dunedin, centred on the city's Chinese gardens.

North America

Many cities in North America sponsor official parades for the Chinese New Year. Among the cities with such parades are New York City (Manhattan; Flushing, Queens; and Brooklyn), San Francisco, Los Angeles, Boston, Chicago, Mexico City, Toronto, and Vancouver. However, even smaller cities that are historically connected to Chinese immigration, such as Butte, Montana, have recently hosted parades.

New York

Multiple groups in New York City cooperate to sponsor a week-long Lunar New Year celebration. The festivities include cultural festival, music concert, fireworks on the Hudson River near the Chinese Consulate, and special exhibits. One of the key celebrations is the Chinese New Year parade with floats and fireworks taking place along the streets in Chinatown, Manhattan, the largest Chinese New Year parade outside Asia. In June 2015, New York City Mayor Bill de Blasio declared that the Lunar New Year would be made a public school holiday.

California

Signed into law in 2022, and effective 2023, California declared Lunar New Year a state holiday. Many communities throughout all of California celebrate with large celebrations taking place in both the Bay Area and Greater Los Angeles as well as in Fresno, Sacramento, San Diego, Santa Rosa, and Stockton.

San Francisco
The San Francisco Chinese New Year Festival and Parade is the oldest and one of the largest events of its kind outside of Asia, and one of the largest Asian cultural events in North America.

The festival incorporates Grant and Kearny Streets into its street festival and parade route, respectively. The use of these streets traces its lineage back to early parades beginning the custom in San Francisco. In 1849, with the discovery of gold and the ensuing California Gold Rush, over 50,000 people had come to San Francisco to seek their fortune or just a better way of life. Among those were many Chinese, who had come to work in the gold mines and on the railroad. By the 1860s, the residents of San Francisco's Chinatown were eager to share their culture with their fellow San Francisco residents who may have been unfamiliar with (or hostile towards) it. The organizers chose to showcase their culture by using a favorite American tradition – the parade. They invited a variety of other groups from the city to participate, and they marched down what today are Grant Avenue and Kearny Street carrying colorful flags, banners, lanterns, drums, and firecrackers to drive away evil spirits.

In San Francisco, over 100 units participate in the annual Chinese New Year Parade held since 1958. The parade is attended by some 500,000 people along with another 3 million TV viewers.

Greater Los Angeles 
The Golden Dragon Parade has happened annually in  Chinatown Los Angeles since 1899, one of the oldest and largest Chinese New Year parades outside of Asia. Beginning in the 1970s, famous Asian American actors have held the title of Grand Marshall of the parade, the first being Bruce Lee. 

Around Southern California many communities also put on festivals and parades that can last multiple days, with some of the largest occurring in the San Gabriel Valley, home to the largest Chinese community outside of Asia and often called the first suburban Chinatown, and  Little Saigon where many Vietnamese and Chinese live.  Monterey Park puts on the largest of such festivals, occupying 5 blocks in the city and attracting over 100,000 individuals. Neighboring Alhambra also has hosted a large festival since 1993 with many performances and street vendors.  San Gabriel hosts an annual Chinese Gala at the San Gabriel Mission Playhouse in addition to its street festival.

The  Little Saigon area has hosted Tet celebrates since 1982 for its Chinese and Vietnamese community. Originally held at Garden Grove Park, with parades in both  Garden Grove and Westminster, starting in 2014 a larger celebration is also held at the Orange County Fair and Events Center in  Costa Mesa which attracts over 50,000 visitors. Neighboring  Fountain Valley also hosts an annual Chinese New Year carnival in Mile Square Regional Park with many food vendors and a ferris wheel.

Many people also celebrate by going to temples across Southern California, and the largest temple celebration is held at Hsi Lai Temple in Hacienda Heights. Most major shopping malls will also decorate for Chinese New Year. 

Disneyland California Adventure in Anaheim celebrates Chinese New Year by decorating certain areas of the park in Chinese displays, serving specialty East Asian foods and allowing for character photos with Mulan, Mushu, Raya, Tigger and Mickey and Minnie Mouse in Chinese Costumes.

Some other communities that hold Chinese New Year Celebrations include  Eastvale, Hollywood,  Irvine, Palos Verdes, Pasadena,  Rancho Cucamonga,  Riverside, Rosemead,  San Marino,  San Pedro, Santa Monica, Temple City, Tustin, and West Covina.

Europe
 United Kingdom

In London, celebrations take place in Chinatown, Leicester Square, and Trafalgar Square. Festivities include a parade, cultural feast, fireworks, concerts, and performances. The celebration attracts between 300,000 and 500,000 people yearly according to the organisers.

 France
In Paris, celebrations have been held since the 1980s in several districts during one month with many performances and the main of the three parades with 40 groups and 4,000 performers is attended alone by more than 200,000 people in the 13th arrondissement.

 Netherlands
Celebrations have been held officially in The Hague since 2002. Other celebrations are held in Amsterdam and in Rotterdam.

India and Pakistan

Many celebrate the festival in Chinatown, Kolkata, India, where a significant community of people of Chinese origin exists. In Kolkata, Chinese New Year is celebrated with lion and dragon dance.

In Pakistan, the Chinese New Year is also celebrated among the sizable Chinese expatriate community that lives in the country. During the festival, the Chinese embassy in Islamabad arranges various cultural events in which Pakistani arts and cultural organizations and members of the civil society also participate.

Mauritius 
Chinese culture in Mauritius is an important component of the multiculturalism in Mauritius. Despite the small size of the Sino-Mauritian community (estimated to be only about 3% of the total population), Chinese New Year (also known as Chinese Spring Festival) is a time where Chinese culture is celebrated on the island and is a public holiday in Mauritius. Mauritius is also the only country in Africa which lists the Chinese Spring Festival as a statutory public holiday. During this period of the year, there is a joyful and festive atmosphere throughout the entire country.

Sino-Mauritians are very attached to Chinese traditions. The Chinese Spring Festival is the biggest celebration for the Sino-Mauritians on the island. The dates of the celebration follows the Chinese lunar calendar instead of the Gregorian calendar. During the week prior to the New Year's Day, spring cleaning in homes is performed.The festival starts on Chinese New Year's Eve by lighting on firecrackers to ward off evil spirits. Traditionalist visit pagodas to offer offerings and prayers on the New Year's Eve.Following Chinese customs, there is a big family dinner on the New Year's Eve. While the family dinner was traditionally celebrated at the house of the oldest family parents, going to restaurants for New Year's Eve is getting more popular; some restaurants may also have special dinners across the island to foster the family reunions of Sino-Mauritians. After the New year's Eve dinner, youths often go to nightclubs. On the day of the Chinese New Year, it is customary for Sino-Mauritian to share niangao to their relatives and friends and to lit firecrackers to ward off evil spirits. Red envelopes are also given. Some families would also visit pagoda on New Year to honor their ancestors. Some families observe a vegetarian diet on the New Year. The main celebration events typically take place in the Chinatown area in Port Louis, the capital of Mauritius. The Dragon dance and the Southern Lion dance is also customary on that day. The colour red is dominantly used to decorate the streets and houses. Chinese items (e.g. Chinese lanterns) are also used as decorations.

Greetings
New Year couplets printed in gold letters on bright red paper, referred to as chunlian or fai chun, is another way of expressing auspicious new year wishes. They probably predate the Ming dynasty (1368–1644), but did not become widespread until then. Today, they are ubiquitous with Chinese New Year.

Some of the most common greetings include:
Xin nian kuai le / San nin fai lok: ; Hakka: Sin Ngen Kai Lok; Taishanese: Slin Nen Fai Lok. A more contemporary greeting reflective of Western influences, it literally translates from the greeting "Happy new year" more common in the west. It is written in English as "xin nian kuai le". And  can be used from the first day to the fifth day of Chinese New Year. However,  is considered very short and therefore somewhat discourteous.
Gong xi fa cai / Gong hei fat choi: ; Hokkien: Kiong hee huat chai (POJ: Kiong-hí hoat-châi); Cantonese: Gung1 hei2 faat3 coi4; Hakka: Gung hee fatt choi, which loosely translates to "Congratulations and be prosperous". It is spelled varyingly in English, such as "Gung hay fat choy", "gong hey fat choi", or "Kung Hei Fat Choy". It is often mistakenly assumed to be synonymous with "Happy New Year". The saying is now commonly heard in English speaking communities for greetings during Chinese New Year in parts of the world where there is a sizable Chinese-speaking community, including overseas Chinese communities that have been resident for several generations, relatively recent immigrants from Greater China, and those who are transit migrants (particularly students).

Numerous other greetings exist, some of which may be exclaimed out loud to no one in particular in specific situations. For example, as breaking objects during the new year is considered inauspicious, one may then say  (Suìsuì-píng'ān) immediately, which means "everlasting peace year after year".

The most common auspicious greetings and sayings consist of four characters, such as the following:
 ,  – "May your wealth [gold and jade] come to fill a hall"
 ,  – "May you realize your ambitions"
 ,  – "Greet the New Year and encounter happiness"
 ,  – "May all your wishes be fulfilled"
 ,  – "May your happiness be without limit"
 ,  – "May you hear [in a letter] that all is well"
 ,  – "May a small investment bring ten-thousandfold profits"
 ,  – "May your happiness and longevity be complete"
 ,  – "When wealth is acquired, precious objects follow"

These greetings or phrases may also be used just before children receive their red packets, when gifts are exchanged, when visiting temples, or even when tossing the shredded ingredients of yusheng particularly popular in Malaysia and Singapore. Children and their parents can also pray in the temple, in hopes of getting good blessings for the new year to come.

Children and teenagers sometimes jokingly use the phrase "", roughly translated as "Congratulations and be prosperous, now give me a red envelope!". In Hakka the saying is more commonly said as 'Gung hee fatt choi, hung bao diu loi' which would be written as  – a mixture of the Cantonese and Mandarin variants of the saying.

Back in the 1960s, children in Hong Kong used to say  (Cantonese, Gung Hei Fat Choy, Lai Si Tau Loi, Tau Ling M Ngoi), which was recorded in the pop song Kowloon Hong Kong by Reynettes in 1966. Later in the 1970s, children in Hong Kong used the saying: , roughly translated as, "Congratulations and be prosperous, now give me a red envelope, fifty cents is too little, don't want a dollar either." It basically meant that they disliked small change – coins which were called "hard substance". Instead, they wanted "soft substance", which was either a ten dollar or a twenty dollar note.

See also
 Other celebrations of Lunar New Year in China:
 Tibetan New Year (Losar)
 Mongolian New Year (Tsagaan Sar)
 Celebrations of Lunar New Year in other parts of Asia:
 Buryat New Year (Sagaalgan)
 Korean New Year (Seollal)
 Japanese New Year (Shōgatsu)
 Mongolian New Year (Tsagaan Sar)
 Vietnamese New Year (Tết Nguyên Đán)
 Similar Asian Lunisolar New Year celebrations that occur in April:
 Burmese New Year (Thingyan)
 Cambodian New Year (Chaul Chnam Thmey)
 Lao New Year (Pii Mai)
 Sri Lankan New Year (Aluth Avuruddu)
 Thai New Year (Songkran)
 Chinese New Year Gregorian Holiday in Malaysia
 Malaysia Chinese New Year (Tahun Baru Cina)
 Indonesian Chinese New Year (Imlek)
 Lunar New Year fireworks display in Hong Kong
 The Birthday of Che Kung

Notes

References

Bibliography

External links 
 

 
New Year celebrations
Public holidays in Cambodia
Public holidays in China
Public holidays in Indonesia
Public holidays in Malaysia
Public holidays in the Philippines
Public holidays in Singapore
Public holidays in Taiwan
Public holidays in Thailand
East Asia
Southeast Asia
Observances set by the Chinese calendar
Winter events in China
Buddhist holidays
Taoist holidays
Chinese-Australian culture
Articles containing video clips